Colin Stewart may refer to:
 Colin Stewart (alpine skier) (1927–2015), American Olympic skier
 Colin Stewart (footballer) (born 1980), English-born Scottish goalkeeper
 Colin Stewart (record producer) (born 1974), record producer and audio engineer
 Colin Stewart (rugby union) (born 1980), Scottish rugby union player
 R. Colin Stewart (1926–1994), Canadian politician

See also
 Colin Stuart (disambiguation)